Benkadi is a rural commune in the Cercle of Sikasso in the Sikasso Region of southern Mali. The commune covers an area of 175 square kilometers and includes 7 villages. In the 2009 census it had a population of 3,077. The main village (chef-lieu) of Koungoba is 89 km west-northwest of Sikasso.

References

External links
.

Communes of Sikasso Region